Roland Frőhlich (born 8 August 1988) is a Hungarian football player who plays for BVSC-Zugló.

References
Profile at HLSZ

1988 births
Living people
Sportspeople from Dunaújváros
Hungarian footballers
Association football forwards
MTK Budapest FC players
Dunaújváros FC players
Bajai LSE footballers
Szekszárdi UFC footballers
Pécsi MFC players
Kozármisleny SE footballers
Paksi FC players
Mezőkövesdi SE footballers
Ceglédi VSE footballers
Soroksár SC players
Szentlőrinci SE footballers
Budapesti VSC footballers
Nemzeti Bajnokság I players
Nemzeti Bajnokság II players
Nemzeti Bajnokság III players
21st-century Hungarian people